Huang Xiaoxiao (born March 3, 1983, in Qingdao, Shandong) is a Chinese hurdler who specialises in the 400 metres hurdles.

Huang made her first impression on the world stage at the Athletics at the 2003 Summer Universiade, where she took a silver in the 400 m hurdles. Although disappointed when she did not qualify for the final heat of the Athens Olympics in 2004, Huang ran solidly at the next year's 2005 World Championships in Athletics, where she finished fifth in the 400m hurdles. She returned to the competition at the 2009 World Championships in Athletics and she reached the semifinals of the event.

The majority of her medals come from continental competitions in Asia. She won the hurdles title at the 2005 Asian Athletics Championships in a Championship record time of 55.63 seconds. Huang won at the 2005 East Asian Games later that year, setting a Games record in the process. She represented Asia at the 2006 IAAF World Cup, coming sixth in the final. Her strength on the Asian athletics scene was again confirmed at the 2006 Asian Games where she again beat all-comers.

Huang dominates the sport at home. At the 10th National Games in 2005, she won gold medals in the 400m and 400m hurdles. She repeated the feat at the 11th Chinese National Games in 2009, and also took the silver with Shandong in the 400 m relay event.

Her personal best time is 54.00 seconds, achieved during the heats at the 2007 World Championships in Osaka. The current Chinese and Asian record is 53.96 seconds.

International competitions

References

1983 births
Living people
Athletes from Qingdao
Chinese female hurdlers
Olympic athletes of China
Athletes (track and field) at the 2004 Summer Olympics
Athletes (track and field) at the 2012 Summer Olympics
Asian Games gold medalists for China
Asian Games bronze medalists for China
Asian Games medalists in athletics (track and field)
Athletes (track and field) at the 2006 Asian Games
World Athletics Championships athletes for China
Universiade medalists in athletics (track and field)
Medalists at the 2006 Asian Games
Universiade silver medalists for China
Runners from Shandong
Medalists at the 2003 Summer Universiade